Heat shock transcription factor 5 is a protein that in humans is encoded by the HSF5 gene.

References

Further reading